Deborah Zarin is a program director at the Multi-Regional Clinical Trials Center of Brigham and Women's Hospital and Harvard University. She was formerly a scientist at the National Institutes of Health and the director of ClinicalTrials.gov.

Zarin has a reputation as an advocate for open data.

In 2014 Zarin accepted a visiting scholar appointment at the Stanford University School of Medicine to research the quality of scientific investigations.

Bibliography

"Is a Trial For You?", an article from 2005 in The Washington Post

References

External links
profile at NIH
September 2014 interview at the Knoepfler Lab Stem Cell Blog

Living people
Year of birth missing (living people)
Place of birth missing (living people)
National Institutes of Health faculty
American women scientists
21st-century American women